Central Pashto are the middle dialects:Mangal  Dzadrāṇi,  Banusi and Waziri. These dialects are affected by what Ibrahim Khan terms as "the Great Karlāṇ Vowel Shift".

Here is a comparison of Middle Dialects with South Eastern:

Northern

Zadrani 
Daniel Septfonds provides the following example:

Vowel Shift 
In Źadrāṇi, a vowel shift like Waziri has  been noted:

Apridi 
Afridi/Apridi is also categorised as a Northern Phonology.

Vowel Shift 

There is presence of the additional vowels close-mid central rounded vowel  /ɵ/ and open back rounded  vowel /ɒː / in Apridi. The following vowel shift has been noted by Josef Elfenbein:

 The [a] in  Pashto can become [ɑ]  and also [e] in Apridi:

 The [ɑ] in Pashto can become [ɒː]  in Apridi:

 The  [o] in Pashto can becomes [ɵ] in Apridi:

 The  [u] in Pashto can becomes [i] in Apridi:

Lexical Comparison 
Naseem Khan Naseem provides the following list:

Sample Text 

The following difference can be noticed in pronunciation:

Kurama 
The following is an example from Central Kurram agency; where a change in /ɑ/ to /ɔ/ can be seen:

Southern

Waziri

Vowel Shift 
In Waziri Pashto there is also a vowel shift

In Waziri dialect the stressed   in general Pashto  becomes . 

When   in begins a word in general Pashto can become  ,   or [w]

Diphthongs in Waziri 
A change is noticed:

Khattak

Vowel Lengthening 
The Khattak dialect, as deduced by Yusuf Khan Jazab in contrast to non-Karāṇi dialects differentiates  lexemes in term of vowel lengthening.

Vocabulary 
The following words which are rare in Kandhari and Yusapzai Pashto, were noted by Yousaf Khan Jazab in the Khattak dialect:

Baniswola [Banusi]

Nasalisation 
In the Bannu dialect the nasalisation of vowels has been noted , as mentioned by Yousuf Khan Jazab:

Stress 

As with other dialects stress on a particular syllable can also change the meaning of a word or aspect of the verb.

References

Bibliography
 
 
 

Varieties of Pashto